Copelatus divisus is a species of diving beetle. It is part of the genus Copelatus in the subfamily Copelatinae of the family Dytiscidae. It was described by Chris Watts in 1978.

The Australian Faunal Directory considers Copelatus divisus to be a synonym of Copelatus portior .

It is found in coastal rainforest in Papua New Guinea, and in Australia in the Northern Territory and Queensland.

References

divisus
Beetles described in 1978